The Philippines participated at the 10th Southeast Asian Games held from 21 to 30 September 1979 in Jakarta, Indonesia.

SEA Games performance

Medalists

Gold

Silver

Bronze

Multiple

References

External links
 Official Site

1979 in Philippine sport
Nations at the 1979 Southeast Asian Games
Philippines at the Southeast Asian Games